The National Academy of Legal Studies and Research (NALSAR), is a public law school and a National Law University located in Shamirpet, Hyderabad, Telangana, India. It is among the first universities to offer the five-year integrated undergraduate law degree, postgraduate law degree and doctorate law degree. The school is known for its highly competitive admissions. It has an intake of around 132 students selected from a pool of around 56,000 students in its undergraduate law programme.

Campus

The law school is spread over 55 acre (22 hectare), divided into five precincts. The first is the Administrative Block which is adjoining the Academic Block. The Academic Block consists of the classrooms, conference halls, the library, the internet centre, a moot court hall, and research centres. The residential block consists of five separate hostels for boys and girls each. The entire campus is WiFi network enabled. The stadium forms the fourth while the law school dining hall forms the fifth. Miscellaneous structures include the commemorative 'Keerthi Stambh' and a replica of 'The Thinker' by Auguste Rodin. An auditorium, with a seating capacity of close to 500, has also been completed.

Academics

Academic programmes

Undergraduate degree
NALSAR offers a five-year integrated B.A LL.B.(Hons.) program and Integrated Program of Management (BBA+MBA). Admission to the undergraduate program is on the basis of the Common Law Admission Test (CLAT) which is taken by upwards of 80,000 students every year. With only 120 seats offered at NALSAR, the program is considered highly selective. NALSAR follows a credit-based elective system, with certain mandatory courses, which require students to earn 200 credits over a period of five years to earn the degree.

Postgraduate degrees
NALSAR offers a one-year postgraduate LL.M. program. 50 students are admitted through CLAT with ten more spots allocated to foreign nationals. About ten areas of specialization are offered, and the program requirements include a dissertation. Additionally, two-year (four semesters) self-financed master's degree in Business Laws and Administration (MBLA)is also offered by the university apart from a one-year Master of Philosophy (M.Phil.) which is open to candidate with an LL.M. degree, and a Doctor of Philosophy (Ph.D.). As a first among the Indian National Law Universities, starting academic year 2013–14, NALSAR now also offers a two-year M.B.A. program.

Similarly, CASL has introduced innovative courses in Aviation, Space, Telecommunications, GIS and Remote Sensing. Its objective is to cater to the unprecedented growth and commercialization of the Aviation, Space and Telecom sectors. CASL's initiative aims to institutionalize an academy-industry partnership in these sectors- a first of its kind, not just in India but perhaps in the entire Asia-Pacific Region. It offers the following two degrees: Master's Degree in Aviation Law and Air Transport Management (MALATM) and a master's degree in Space and Telecommunication Laws (MSTL).

NALSAR Pro offers PG Diploma courses in Patents Law, Cyber Laws, Media Laws and International Humanitarian Laws using web technology and direct contact programs at various centers in India. CASL offers PG Diploma in Aviation Law and Air Transport Management (PGDALATM); PG Diploma in GIS & Remote Sensing Laws (PGDGRL).

Law library
NALSAR's library has a collection of more than 27,000 items comprising law reports, reviews, periodicals, manuals and choicest publications of textbooks and other resources. The Law Resource Center is the hub of all library activities and aims at fulfilling the research and academic objectives of the university. Its rich collection of primary and secondary legal resources is accessible to all the users in the campus. The VPN-configured Online Public Access Catalogue (OPAC) is accessible from any terminal in and out of the campus. It is designed to provide online information on the availability of titles and to allow the patrons to request for items that are on loan, renewal of books, access to patron accounts and other information services. Unlike the traditional OPACS, each record provides bibliographic information with hot links to the table of contents pages, reviews, publishers' notes, and peer driven reviews and ratings. The library has a depository of UN collections. A separate section houses all the proceedings of the organs of the United Nations. The print collection is augmented by online access.

Published journals
NALSAR publishes the following law journals:
 Indian Journal of Air and Space Law ( IJASL)
 M. K. Nambyar SAARC Law Journal
 NALSAR Law Review
 NALSAR Student Law Review
 Journal of Corporate Affairs and Corporate Crimes
 Indian Journal of Constitutional Law
 Media Law Review
 Environmental Law & Practice Review
 The Indian Journal Law & Economics
 Nalsar ADR Journal
 Indian Journal of Intellectual Property Law

DoMS
 
DoMS is unique amongst India’s B-schools because it seeks to enrich the legal foundations of graduates with a working knowledge of business practices and enlighten those seeking careers in management regarding the legal requirements for business processes.
The five-year Integrated Program in Management (IPM) at NALSAR is a unique program for young ignited minds aspiring to pursue a career path in Business Management. It is designed as a comprehensive management program for students after class XII. The students would be awarded Bachelor of Business Administration (BBA) and Master of Business Administration (MBA) by NALSAR after successful completion of five years of the program Located in a conducive learning environment, NALSAR promises to offer the best of management education embedded with the law to produce legally aware managers with critical problem-solving ability and skills to manage extremely dynamic business scenarios with the best-in-class faculty, the IPM program promises a constant dialogue with business leaders, thought leaders, civil society actors, and academicians for providing strong bedrock for the future managers.

Consisting of fifteen terms spread across five years, the first 3 years of the program are aimed at providing strong theoretical underpinnings, and conceptual and practical insights in the various areas of philosophy, psychology, fine arts, mathematics, economics, law, and management. The last 2 years are aimed at nurturing holistic transformation from students into future business leaders and managers.

DoMS offers a voluntary exit to the students after successfully completing the program requirement at the end of 3 years and such students shall be awarded a degree of Bachelor of Business Administration (BBA)

In addition to the academic rigor, the diverse environment at DoMS opens up avenues for personal growth through its interactions with various stakeholders and facilitates the holistic personality development of students.

Research centres

NALSAR houses research centres:
Animal Law Centre (ALC)
M.K. Nambyar SAARC Law Research Centre
 Centre for Air and Space Law
 Centre for Land Rights
 Centre for Corporate Law and Governance
 Dr. N.C. Banerjee Centre for Intellectual Property Law Studies
 Dr. S.P. Chatterjee Centre for Environmental Law Studies
 Centre for Proximate and Continuing Education (C-PACE)
 Centre for Humanitarian Law and Refugee Law

 Centre for Alternative Dispute Resolution
 Centre for Media Law and Public Policy
 Centre for Legal Philosophy and Justice Education
 Centre for Tax Laws
 Centre for Culture, Law and Society (C-CLS)
 Centre for Constitutional Law, Policy & Good Governance
 Centre for Criminal Justice Administration and Human Rights
 Centre for Disaster Management and Law
 Centre for Family Law
 Centre for Tribal and Land Rights

Student life

Moot court competitions
Nalsar students have excelled in mooting in both the national as well as international domain.

It was ranked amongst the top in the world at the international rounds of the Philip C. Jessup Moot Court Competition 2006 at Washington, D.C. In 2007, Nalsar was placed amongst the top eight teams in the world, at the Philip C. Jessup International Law Moot Court Competition. In 2010, the team from Nalsar finished as semi-finalists in the Jessup International Law Moot Competition.

NALSAR made it to the top 12 teams and competed in the International Finals of the 11th Annual Stetson Environmental Moot Court Competition held at Stetson University College of Law, Florida in November 2006. Nalsar finished as runners-up in the first edition of the ICC Trial Competition at The Hague, a feat it repeated in 2011. In 2009, Nalsar won the D.M. Harish International Moot Court Competition. The team also won the Best Speaker and Best Researcher prizes. In 2011, Nalsar were the semi-finalists in the Asia-Pacific rounds of the Manfred Lachs Moot Court Competition. In 2012, Nalsar won the Monroe E. Price International Media Law Moot Court Competition at the University of Oxford.

In 2014, Nalsar won the Willem C. Vis International Commercial Arbitration Moot Court Competition, conducted at Vienna.

Nalsar was judged the best in India in mooting in the first two seasons of the  Mooting Premiere League in 2009-2010 and 2010–2011.

Debating
NALSAR won India's oldest Parliamentary Debate at St. Stephens College, Delhi in December 2005. This was followed by victories at the  Annual Parliamentary Debate held at the Indian Institute of Technology, Madras in January 2007 and 2009, the debate conducted by the Indian Institute of Information Technology, Hyderabad in February 2007, and that of the Young Orators Club of Secunderabad in 2008.  NALSAR further cemented its reputation on the debating circuit by winning the inaugural IIM Bangalore Parliamentary Debating Championship 'Cicero' in January 2009.

The NALSAR Intervarsity Debating Championship is the pioneer of the British Parliamentary Debating format in India. The idea for the NALSAR IV was born to introduce the British Parliamentary debate format to the national debating circuit and provide a preparatory ground for the WUDC (World Universities Debating Championship), the most prestigious debating championship in the world. Thus, the NALSAR IV is aimed at exposing debaters to the most competitive standards of adjudication. The NALSAR IV has now earned the name to be one of the most prestigious debating championships in India.

Quizzing
NALSAR finished as runners-up in the K-Circle India Quiz 2010 and 2011, as well as winners in BITS Pilani-Hyderabad Campus' annual fest Pearl 2012, 2013 and 2015. A 4th year team won the Best College Team title at the Landmark Quiz held at Hyderabad on 6 October 2013. NALSAR also finished second in Manipal's Quiz on The Beach 2015 and Tata Crucible Hyderabad 2015. A team won the Economic Times in Campus Quiz for two years consecutively in 2014 and 2015. The university has also hosted its own QuizFests, titled 'Interrobang'.

Gender-neutral University 
In March 2022, NALSAR announced its plans to go gender-neutral. It created gender-neutral spaces in its hostels and washrooms. The University proposes to do away with Mr and Miss in the certificates / degrees. The University is adopting a Policy on Inclusive Education for Sexual and Gender Minorities, which will take into consideration self-affirmed gender of the students irrespective of their legal identification in birth certificates or Aadhar Cards.

See also
 Legal education in India
 List of law schools in India

References

External links

NALSAR website
Library

1998 establishments in Andhra Pradesh
Law schools in Telangana
Legal research
National Law Universities
Research institutes in Hyderabad, India
NALSAR University of Law
Educational institutions established in 1998
State universities in Telangana